The Kentucky Kernel is the student newspaper of the University of Kentucky.

The Kernel is distributed free on and around the University of Kentucky campus. It claims a circulation of 8,000 and readership of more than 30,000. Its sole source of revenue is advertising. It is issued during the weekdays during the spring and fall semesters.

History
The Kentucky Kernel was preceded by several student newspapers, with the earliest dating to 1892. From 1908 to 1915, the University of Kentucky's student newspaper was called The Idea, but it became the Kentucky Kernel following a naming contest in 1915. The first issue produced under the Kernel name was published September 16, 1915.

The paper had become an eight-page weekly by 1923, and it became a Monday-Friday daily newspaper in 1966.

In 1972, the Kernel formally established its editorial and financial independence from the University of Kentucky administration.

Operations and alumni
The Kernel operates out of the Grehan Journalism Building, which is located in central campus and also is the home of the School of Journalism and Telecommunications and the Department of Communication. The Grehan Building was completed in 1951 and named to honor Enoch Grehan, the founder of the school's Department of Journalism and one of its first faculty members.

Several prominent journalists worked at the Kernel while they were students, including current Associated Press Chief White House Correspondent Terence Hunt, former National Geographic photographer Sam Abell, current Chicago Tribune Washington correspondent William Neikirk and current New York Times South Africa correspondent Michael Wines.

The writer Bobbie Ann Mason also worked at the Kernel. The famous Disney writer and illustrator Don Rosa worked for the Kernel from 1969 to 1973. The Pertwillaby Papers were first printed in the Kernel, which inspired many of Rosa's later creations, including the Scrooge McDuck tales The Son of the Sun, Cash Flow, and The Last Lord of Eldorado.

Controversies
On October 5, 2007, the newspaper published an editorial cartoon that was considered racially insensitive to some students. The cartoon depicted an African American being auctioned off to fraternities and sororities in an attempt by the cartoonist to depict racial divide in the fraternity system. The paper officially apologized the next day and the incident spawned a panel discussion on diversity.

Awards
In 2006, 2008, 2015 and 2019 the Kernel won the National Pacemaker Award from the Associated Collegiate Press after having been nominated for several years.

References

External links
Official website
Kentucky Kernel archive, University of Kentucky Libraries Special Collections Research Center

Student newspapers published in Kentucky
University of Kentucky
1892 establishments in Kentucky